Nicolas Sansu (born 17 June 1968) is a French politician and engineer.

He is member of the French Communist Party and served as mayor of Vierzon since 2008. He was re-elected of the mayor of Vierzon in 2014. He is vice-president of the General Council in charge of infrastructures. He was elected MP for Cher's 2nd constituency in the 2012 French legislative election. He was according to Capital magazine and the Regards citizens collective, the 39th best MP in the National Assembly for his attendance and his parliamentary work. He lost his seat in the 2017 French legislative election.

He was the NUPES candidate in Cher's 2nd constituency in the 2022 French legislative election. He was re-elected to the seat, winning it back off MoDem's Nadia Essayan, who was eliminated in the first round.

Why refer to Pascal Blanc's biography when search and information above refers to Nicholas Sansu?

Biography
Pascal Blanc was born in Vierzon, France on 1968. He announced in October 2019 to be a candidate for the 3rd time in the municipal election in Vierzon. He also member of the UNEF-SE national office during his studies, he holds a diploma of advanced studies in economic sciences. He is elected mayor by the new municipal council.

References 

1968 births
Living people
People from Vierzon
Deputies of the 14th National Assembly of the French Fifth Republic
French Communist Party politicians
20th-century French politicians
21st-century French politicians
Mayors of places in Centre-Val de Loire

Candidates for the 2022 French legislative election
Deputies of the 16th National Assembly of the French Fifth Republic